All Jacked Up and Full of Worms is a 2022 American horror film directed by Alex Phillips, starring Trevor Dawkins, Phillip Andre Botello, and Betsey Brown.

Cast
Phillip Andre Botello as Roscoe
Trevor Dawkins as Benny
Betsey Brown as Samantha
Mike Lopez as Biff

Release
The film premiered at the Fantasia International Film Festival on 16 July 2022. It is also part of Fantastic Fest's Burnt Ends 2022 showcase.

Reception
Mary Beth McAndrews of Dread Central rated the film 3.5 stars out of 5, writing "Transgressive, upsetting, and disturbing, ‘All Jacked Up And Full Of Worms’ is a slippery nightmare that tries a little too hard to be disgusting." The film received positive reviews in ScreenAnarchy and RogerEbert.com.

Simon Rother of HorrorNews.net'' was more critical of the film, giving it a score of 4/10.

References

External links
 
 

American horror films
2022 films
2022 horror films